2009-10 Professional Arena Soccer League (PASL-Pro) season is the second season for the league. The schedule was announced in September 2009. The season kicked off on Friday November 13, when the expansion Louisville Lightning hosted the 1790 Cincinnati Express.

Standings
As of March 8, 2010

(Bold indicates Division Winner)

  La Raza de Guadalajara defeated Sidekicks del Estado de Mexico in a shootout in the 2009-10 LMFR Finals on January 30.  The teams will be Mexico's two entrants in the 2010 PASL-Pro North American Finals.

2010 PASL-Pro North American Finals (at San Diego, CA)

Awards

All-League First Team

All-League Second Team

References

External links
 PASL-Pro official website

 
Professional Arena Soccer League
Professional Arena Soccer League
Professional Arena Soccer League seasons